The Aures Mountains are an eastern prolongation of the Atlas Mountain System that lies to the east of the Saharan Atlas in northeastern Algeria and northwestern Tunisia, North Africa. The mountain range gives its name to the mountainous natural and historical region of the Aures.

Geography
The Aures mountains are the eastern continuation of the Saharan Atlas. They are located at a lower elevation than the High Atlas mountains of Morocco.

The Belezma Range is a northwestern prolongation of the Aures Mountains located where the Tell Atlas and the Saharan Atlas come together. The Atlas chain of mountains extends over 1000 kilometers in total over Northern Africa.

History
Historically, the Aures served as a refuge and bulwark for the Berber tribes, forming a base of resistance against the Romans, Vandals, Byzantine, and Arabs along the centuries.  

The mountain area was also a district of French Algeria that existed during and after the Algerian War of Independence from 1954 to 1962. It was in this region that the Algerian War of Independence was started by Berber freedom fighters. The rugged terrain of the Aures makes it still one of the least developed areas in the Maghreb.

Population
In eastern Algeria, the Aures is a large Berber-speaking region, home of the Chaoui people. The Chaoui eastern Berber population practices traditional transhumance, farming fixed stone terraces in the mountains where they grow sorghum, as well as other grains and vegetables. Seasonally they move their cattle to relatively warm areas in the lowland valleys where they pitch tents or live in other temporary structures and tend livestock through the winter.

Features

See also
 Aures region
 Geography of Algeria

References

External links

 Les Aurès - Algérie (French). Includes many photos of the region.

Mountain ranges of the Atlas Mountains
Mountain ranges of Algeria